PCPA may refer to:

Science
 para-Chlorophenylalanine (fenclonine), a synthetic amino acid
 Premature cleavage and polyadenylation
para-Chlorophenoxyacetate (pCPA), a pesticide

Other
 Pacific Conservatory of the Performing Arts, a school in Santa Maria, California, United States
 Poor Clares of Perpetual Adoration, an order of nuns in the Franciscan tradition
 Portland Center for the Performing Arts, in Portland, Oregon, United States